Hystaspes or Guštāsp (fl. 550 BC), was a Persian satrap of Bactria and Persis. He was the father of Darius I, emperor of the Achaemenid Empire, and Artabanus, who was a trusted advisor to both his brother Darius as well as Darius's son and successor, Xerxes I.

The son of Arsames, Hystaspes was a member of the Persian royal house of the Achaemenids. He was satrap of Persis under Cambyses II, and probably under his second cousin Cyrus the Great also. He accompanied Cyrus on his expedition against the Massagetae. However, he was sent back to Persis to keep watch over his eldest son, Darius, whom Cyrus, after a dream, suspected of considering treason.

Besides Darius, Hystaspes had three sons: Artabanus, Artaphernes, and Artanes, as well as a daughter who married Darius' lance-bearer Gobryas.

Ammianus Marcellinus makes him a chief of the Magians, and tells a story of his studying in India under the Brahmins, an event that would correspond to the Achaemenid conquest of the Indus Valley:

In ancient sources, Hystaspes is sometimes considered as identical with Vishtaspa (the Avestan name for Hystapes), an early patron of Zoroaster.

The  name of Hystaspes occurs in the inscriptions at Persepolis and in the Behistun Inscription, where the full lineage of Darius the Great is given:

Sources

References

Achaemenid dynasty
6th-century BC Iranian people
Governors of Fars
Satraps of the Achaemenid Empire
Achaemenid satraps of Bactria
Family of Darius the Great